Need for Speed Unbound (stylised as NFS Unbound) is a 2022 racing video game developed by Criterion Games and published by Electronic Arts. It is the twenty-fifth instalment in the Need for Speed series, the first for Criterion since 2013's Rivals with Ghost Games and the first as the main developer since 2012's Most Wanted.

Unbound was revealed by Electronic Arts on October 6, 2022. The game features an art style that merges artistic elements like cel-shading and graffiti art with the more realistic art style of other Need for Speed games. The map is based in a fictional city inspired by Chicago called Lakeshore City. The game was released worldwide on December 2, 2022, for PlayStation 5, Windows, and Xbox Series X/S. At launch, the game received positive reviews from critics, who praised the gameplay, art direction, progression, and graphics, while criticising the lack of innovation, story, and bland characters.

Plot
In Lakeshore City, the Player (female player voiced by Elizabeth Grullon, male player voiced by Ian Nelson) and their friend and partner Jasmine/Yaz (portrayed by Ashleigh LaThrop) refurbish an old junker car in their mechanic shop owned by their mentor Rydell (Dwayne Barnes). After winning a couple of street races, Yaz has a disagreement with Rydell over a car and grows tired of being stuck in the same job daily, and wishes to do something better. She tells the player she was contacted by her friend in the foster system, Alec about some jobs involving delivering vehicles, challenging the authority of the city's police force under the control of Mayor Morgan Stevenson (voiced by Debra Wilson).

One night after a couple of races, the Player completes a delivery mission but couldn't find anyone at the drop-off point and Yaz nor Rydell doesn't answer their calls. Instead, the alarm goes off at Rydell's Rides. In a hurry and assuming the worst, the Player races back to Rydell's Rydes to witness it being raided of all the cars Rydell was working on. Confronted by both Rydell and the Player, Yaz denies being involved but drives off with the car after Rydell accuses her of theft and expresses his disappointment.

Two years later, street racing in Lakeshore had declined and Rydell's Rides have been struggling to remain open after the incident. The Player makes a living driving people, one of which is Tess (Jennifer Sun Bell), who the Player goes with to a street race meet-up. Just then, Yaz shows up and the Player discovers that she is part of the crew that stole the rides and is responsible for the resurgence of street racing in Lakeshore. She announces The Grand, a huge street race where the winner will receive a large amount of money. After hearing the Player's story and being introduced to Rydell, Tess proposes bankrolling the garage and rides as well as guiding the Player in their efforts to qualify and get revenge on Yaz and win the car back, in return for making money betting on and against them. The Player then does a number of deliveries for Tess, many of which they are suspicious of but doesn't question due to the money.

After winning the first week's qualifier, the Player confronts and challenges Yaz to the pink slip in The Grand. Tess records the interaction and ensures that Yaz accepts the condition of relinquishing the car on the final race. After the end of the second qualifier, the Player again confronts Yaz, and Tess then reveals the truth: she's been making money betting on and against the Player, but for Alec. All of the deliveries the Player had done earlier were on his behalf, using her as the middleman. Tess informs both of them that Alec wants to cut a deal with all three where neither the Player or Yaz win, but will be paid handsomely for throwing the race. Outraged, Yaz leaves to confront Alec and is disgusted with Tess's actions, the Player tells her they are done.

The Player meets up with Yaz at Rydell's garage and she confirms what Tess said was true, but she didn't want to accept the conditions and came to warn Rydell and the Player. Reconciling for the moment, Yaz proposes relieving Alec of all his car collection, which he acquired illegally through Tess and the Player, including the ones stolen from Rydell's garage, and deliver them to their rightful owners. She mentions that the Player still has to defeat her in the final to win back the car. The Player finally wins The Grand and gets back their car. Tess reveals she was never working for Alec but was just making money off whatever bets and races she could get her hands on, and now that they won, he is ruined and thanks the Player for the money. The Player and Yaz return to the garage and she reconciles with Rydell. Now all being friends again, they prepare for more adventures to come.

Gameplay 

Need for Speed Unbound is a racing game set in a fictional city called Lakeshore City, which is based on Chicago. Like previous entries in the series, it features an open world environment and gameplay similar to that of previous entries in the series, being mainly focused around street racing. The "heat system" from Need for Speed Heat returns in Unbound, where the player attempts to gain notoriety among the police. Additionally, the game features various forms of customization such as installing various body kits, adding a splitter, and even completely removing the front or rear bumpers.

Development and release 
In February 2020, it was announced that the development of future Need for Speed games would return to Criterion Games from Ghost Games, as the studio was referred back to EA Gothenburg. Criterion Games previously worked on Hot Pursuit (2010) and Most Wanted (2012). The game was originally going to be released in 2021 but was pushed back to 2022 as the team was temporarily reassigned to assist the development of Battlefield 2042. In May 2022, EA announced that they had merged Codemasters Cheshire into Criterion Games, creating a larger team to work on the game.

A few days prior to the reveal, fans noticed that EA had accidentally revealed the name of their upcoming Need for Speed title early on their website. Additionally, fans also noticed that promotional images of the game had been released early on the Japanese retailer Neowing's website. Unbound was formally revealed on October 6, 2022, in a trailer that showcased the game's "street art" art style, as well as featuring the rapper A$AP Rocky, who is set to have his own mode in the game as well as have some of his music featured along with AWGE. EA has stated that the game will receive free post-launch updates.

Unbound also received a special collaborative deluxe release with UK-based streetwear and lifestyle brand Palace. At an additional cost to the base game, NFS Unbound Palace Edition includes various branded bonuses, including four cars with Palace liveries and 20 items of Palace-branded clothing for the player's in-game character to wear.

Need for Speed Unbound had an early access release for its Palace Edition on November 29, 2022, with EA Play members (including Xbox Game Pass Ultimate members) being able to try it for ten hours and EA Play Pro members having unlimited early access. The game was released officially on December 2, 2022.

Reception 

According to Metacritic, the PlayStation 5 and Xbox Series X versions of Need for Speed Unbound have received "generally favorable reviews", while the PC version has received "mixed or average reviews".

It was the 17th best-selling retail game in the UK in its week of release. Sales of the game were down 64% when compared with its predecessor Need for Speed Heat.

References

External links
 

2022 video games
Criterion Games games
Electronic Arts games
Frostbite (game engine) games
 25
Open-world video games
PlayStation 5 games
Racing video games
Racing video games set in the United States
Street racing video games
Video games developed in the United Kingdom
Video games featuring protagonists of selectable gender
Video games with cel-shaded animation
Windows games
Xbox Series X and Series S games